EWHS may refer to:
 East Wake High School, Wendell, North Carolina, United States
 East Wilkes High School, Rhonda, North Carolina, United States
 Eastern Wayne High School, Wayne County, North Carolina, United States
 Edmonds Woodway High School, Edmonds, Washington, United States
 Edmondson-Westside High School, Baltimore, Maryland, United States